An election for the Constituent Assembly was held in the French Territory of the Afars and Issas on 8 May 1977 alongside a referendum on independence. The elections were boycotted by the Djibouti Liberation Movement, the National Union for Independence and the Popular Liberation Movement, resulting in the People's Rally for Independence winning all 65 seats.

Results

References

Constituent Assembly election
Afars
Elections in Djibouti
Constituent Assembly election
Afars and Issas Constituent Assembly election